Braian Alexander Angola-Rodas (born April 6, 1994) is a Colombian professional basketball player for Pınar Karşıyaka of the Basketbol Süper Ligi. He played college basketball for the Florida State Seminoles. The  swingman competed for Findlay Prep in high school, before playing at North Idaho College for his first two college seasons. He has represented the Colombia national basketball team.

Early life 
Angola was born in Villanueva, Casanare in Colombia to Ofelia Rodas and Hugo Angola. His mother and two younger sisters,  Karol and Michel, and brother Jhon Fredy, supported his decision to start playing basketball. At age 14, Angola moved alone to the United States to continue his basketball career, despite not speaking any English. In his early years, he drew attention for his success on the Colombian youth national team.

High school career 
At the high school level, Angola represented Findlay Prep, a basketball program based in Henderson, Nevada. Although mostly separated from his family, he often visited them in Colombia. In the 2012–13 season, he averaged 10.0 points, 3.0 rebounds and 2.0 assists with a .500 field goal percentage. Angola helped his team finish with a 35–1 record and a Final Four bid at the DICK'S Sporting Goods High School Nationals tournament. While at Findlay Prep, he was most notably teammates with Nigel Williams-Goss, future college star with the Gonzaga Bulldogs. His time with the team was credited for improving his English.

College career 

Angola first attended North Idaho College in Coeur d'Alene, Idaho, where he played under head coach Corey Symons and George Swanson. As a freshman, he averaged 13.8 points, 6.4 rebounds and 3.4 assists per game, leading the team to a 23–7 record. In his sophomore season, Angola posted 21.4 points, 6.5 rebounds and 4.3 assists per game en route to earning National Junior College Athletic Association (NJCAA) Division I All-America First Team honors. He also helped the team finish with a 31–2 record, starting the season on a 31-game winning streak.

After receiving offers from several major NCAA Division I programs heading into his junior season, Angola transferred to Florida State in April 2016. He saw a limited role as a first-year member of the team, averaging 4.6 points, 1.6 rebounds, and 1.2 assists per game. In his senior season he put 12.5 points, 3.9 rebounds and 3.0 assists per game on a team that reached the Elite Eight of the NCAA Tournament.

Professional career

Lakeland Magic (2018–2019)
After going undrafted in the 2018 NBA Draft, Angola was signed to play for the Orlando Magic for the 2018 NBA Summer League. On October 13, 2018, he was waived by the Magic. On October 29, 2018, Angola was included in the final 12-man roster for the Lakeland Magic.

Filou Oostende (2019–2020)
On April 18, 2019, Filou Oostende of the Pro Basketball League announced they had added Angola. On June 13, 2019, Angola helped Filou Oostende in winning the Pro Basketball League title after a 3–1 win in final against Telenet Antwerp Giants, and named PBL Finals MVP. He averaged 13.5 points, 4.2 rebounds, 2.5 assists and 1.3 steals per game.

Partizan Belgrade (2020)
On February 15, 2020, Angola signed with Partizan Belgrade. In two ABA league games, he averaged 3.0 points and 2.0 rebounds per game. Angola parted ways with the team on November 18.

Ironi Nes Ziona (2020–2021)
On November 26, 2020, Angola signed a contract with Ironi Nes Ziona of the Israeli Basketball Premier League.

AEK Athens (2021–2022)
On August 24, 2021, Angola signed a two-year deal with Greek club AEK Athens of the Basketball Champions League. He was sidelined for a significant portion of the season due to myocardial complications during his COVID-19 recovery. In 13 league games, Angola averaged 13 points (shooting with 35% from the 3-point line), 3.8 rebounds, 2.7 assists and 1 steal, playing around 24 minutes per contest. On July 24, 2022, Angola amicably parted ways with the Greek club.

Galatasaray Nef (2022)
On 25 July 2022, he has signed with Galatasaray Nef of the Turkish Basketbol Süper Ligi (BSL).

Pınar Karşıyaka (2022–present)
On 16 November 2022, Angola signed with Pınar Karşıyaka of the Turkish Basketbol Süper Ligi (BSL).

National team career 
Angola played for the Colombia national basketball team at the 2017 FIBA AmeriCup, where he averaged 12.7 points, 5.7 rebounds, and 2.0 assists per game.

References

External links 
Florida State Seminoles bio

1994 births
Living people
ABA League players
AEK B.C. players
BC Oostende players
Colombian expatriate sportspeople in Belgium
Colombian expatriate sportspeople in Greece
Colombian expatriate sportspeople in Serbia
Colombian expatriate basketball people in the United States
Colombian men's basketball players
Expatriate basketball people in Belgium
Expatriate basketball people in Greece
Expatriate basketball people in Israel
Expatriate basketball people in Serbia
Findlay Prep alumni
Florida State Seminoles men's basketball players
Galatasaray S.K. (men's basketball) players
Ironi Nes Ziona B.C. players
Karşıyaka basketball players
KK Partizan players
Lakeland Magic players
North Idaho Cardinals men's basketball players
People from Casanare Department
Shooting guards
Small forwards